Casper Heesch Olesen (born 10 May 1996) is a Danish footballer who plays as a midfielder.

Club career

SønderjyskE
At the age of 19, Olesen was promoted to the first team squad in January 2015.

Olesen got his Superliga debut on 6 December 2015. Olesen started on the bench, but replaced Andreas Oggesen in the 85th minute in a 1–0 victory against Esbjerg fB in the Danish Superliga.

Olesen extended his contract in May 2016 until the summer 2018. The winger broke his leg in the beginning of August 2017, and was out the rest of the year.

Weiche Flensburg
On 22 July 2019, Olesen moved abroad to Germany and joined Regionalliga Nord club SC Weiche Flensburg 08. Olesen left the club in the summer 2021.

References

External links
 
 
 

1995 births
Living people
Danish men's footballers
Danish expatriate men's footballers
Danish Superliga players
Danish 1st Division players
Ykkönen players
Regionalliga players
SønderjyskE Fodbold players
HIFK Fotboll players
Thisted FC players
SC Weiche Flensburg 08 players
Denmark youth international footballers
Association football wingers
Danish expatriate sportspeople in Finland
Danish expatriate sportspeople in Germany
Expatriate footballers in Finland
Expatriate footballers in Germany
Footballers from Aarhus